Jamuna (30 August 1936 – 27 January 2023; née Nippani) was an Indian actress, director, and politician who appeared mainly in Telugu cinema. She made her acting debut at age 16 in Dr. Garikapati Rajarao's Puttillu (1953), and received her breakthrough with L. V. Prasad Missamma (1955). Her filmography also includes Tamil, Kannada, and Hindi films. She won a Filmfare Award and an award at Filmfare Awards South. She was a member of parliament in the 9th Lok Sabha (1989–1991) representing the Rajahmundry constituency.

Early life
Jamuna was born in  Hampi in present-day Karnataka to Kannada speaking Nippani Srinivasa Rao and Telugu speaking Kowsalya Devi, and was named Jana Bai. Her father was a Madhva Brahmin, while her mother was a Vaisya, resulting in an inter-caste love marriage. Jamuna grew up in Duggirala, in the Guntur District of Andhra Pradesh. Her father was involved in the business of turmeric and tobacco and their family moved there when she was seven years old.  When Savitri was performing drama in Duggirala, she would stay at Jamuna's house. Later, Savitri invited Jamuna to act in films. She began performing as heroines in movies at the age of 16.

Film career
Jamuna was a stage artist in school. Her mother taught her vocal music and harmonium. In 1952, Dr. Garikipati Raja Rao of the Indian People's Theatre Association saw her stage show Maa Bhoomi and offered her a role in his film Puttillu.

Jamuna acted in 198 films in Telugu and other south Indian languages.  She also acted in Hindi films, winning the Filmfare Best Supporting Actress Award for Milan (1967), repeating her role from the original Telugu film Mooga Manasulu (1964).

Jamuna also established the Telugu artist association and through it provided social services for 25 years.

Political career 
Jamuna joined the Congress party in the 1980s and was elected to the Lok Sabha from the Rajahmundry constituency in 1989. She lost the 1991 election and quit politics, but briefly campaigned for the BJP in the late 1990s during Atal Bihari Vajpayee's tenure.

Personal life and death
In 1965 Jamuna married Juluri Ramana Rao, a zoology professor at SV University; he died from cardiac arrest on 10 November 2014 at age 86. They had a son, Vamsee Juluri and a daughter, Sravanthi Juluri, and lived in Hyderabad, Telangana, India.

Jamuna died at her home in Hyderabad on 27 January 2023, at age 86.

Awards 
 1968: Filmfare Award for Best Supporting Actress - Milan
 1972: Filmfare Special Award - South - Pandanti Kapuram
 1999: Tamil Nadu State Film Honorary Award - MGR Award
 2008: NTR National Award
2010: Padmabhushan Dr. B. Sarojadevi National Award
2019: Santosham Lifetime Achievement Award at 17th Santosham Film Awards

Filmography

Telugu

 Puttilu (1953)
 Maa Gopi (1954)
 Bangaru Papa (1954)
 Nirupedalu (1954)
 Vaddante Dabbu (1954)
 Iddaru Pellalu (1954)
 Donga Ramudu (1955)
 Santosham (1955)
 Missamma (1955)
Tenali Ramakrishna (1956)
 Chiranjeevulu (1956)
 Muddu Bidda (1956)
 Chintamani (1956)
 Bhagya Rekha (1957)
 Sati Anasuya (1957)
 Maa Inti Mahalakshmi (1958)
 Bhookailas (1958)
 Appu Chesi Pappu Koodu (1959)
 Illarikam (1959)
 Jalsa Rayudu (1960)
 Pelli Kani Pillalu (1961)
 Gulebakavali Katha (1962)
 Gundamma Katha (1962)
 Srikakula Andhramaha Vishnu (1962)
 Pooja Phalam (1964)
 Bobbili Yuddham (1964)
 Manchi Manishi (1964)
 Mooga Manasulu (1964)
 Muralikrishna (1964)
 Ramudu Bheemudu (1964)Bobbili Yuddham(1964)
 Dorikithe Dongalu(1965)
 Keelu Bommalu (1965)
 Thodu Needa (1965)
 Sri Krishna Tulabharam (1965)
 Leta Manasulu (1966)
 Adugu Jaadalu (1966) as Parvathi
 Chadarangam (1967)
 Poola Rangadu (1967)
 Chinnari Paapalu (1968)
 Bandipotu Dongalu (1968)
 Ramu (1968)
 Undamma Bottu Pedata (1968)
 Atta O Kodalu (1969)
 Ekaveera (1969)
 Mattilo Manikyam (1971)
 Pandanti Kapuram (1972)
 Samsaram (1975)Manushulanta Okkate (1976)
 Kuruskhetram (1977)
 Chiranjeevi Rambabu (1977)  as Rathnam
 Eedu Jodu Adajanma Vanaja Girija Tahsildar Gari Ammayi Collector Janaki Mama Allulla Saval (1980)
 Bangaru Koduku (1982)
 Bangaru ThalliGauriMangamma SapadhamPellirojuGadusu PilladuSrimanthuduManasu MangalyamNavarathriMooganomuPellirojuAmayakuduAllude MenalluduSati AnasuyaRamalayamKakshaChallani NeedaBangaru SankelluNadee AdajanmePalamanasuluMuhurtabalamMenakodaluMamathaSnehabandhamPeddalu MaraliManushulu MattibommaluAdambaralu AnubandhaluDeerghasumangaliAnnapurnamma gari manavaduBahubaliTamil

 Panam Paduthum Padu (1954)
 Jaya Gopi (1955)
 Missiamma (1955)
 Thiruttu Raman (1955)
 Tenali Raman (1956)
 Naga Devathai (1956)
 Kudumba Villakku (1956)
 Thangamalai Ragasiyam (1957)
 Pakka Thirudan (1957)
 Kula Gouravam (1957)
 Bhaktha Ravana (1958)
 Kadan Vaangi Kalyaanam (1958)
 Bommai Kalyanam (1958)
 Vaazhkai Oppandham (1959)
 Kanniraindha Kanavan (1959)
 Thaai Magalukku Kattiya Thaali (1959)
 Nalla Theerpu (1959)
 Kaduvalin Kuzhandai (1960)
 Marutha Nattu Veeran (1961)
 Revathi (1961)
 Nichaya Thaamboolam (1962)
 Dakshayagnam (1962)
 Manithan Maravillai (1962)
 Kuzhandaiyum Deivamum (1965)
 Anbu Sagodharargal (1973)
 Naan Nandri Solven (1979)
 Thoongadhey Thambi Thoongadhey (1983)

KannadaAadarsha Sathi (1955)Tenali Ramakrishna (1956)Bhookailasa (1956)Rathnagiri Rahasya (1957)Sakshatkara (1971)Mayeya Musuku (1980)Guru Sarwabhowma Sri Raghavendra Karune (1980)Police Matthu Dada (1991)

Hindi
 Miss Mary (1957)
 Ek Raaz (1963)
 Hamrahi (1963)
 Beti Bete (1964)
 Rishte Nate (1965)
 Milan (1967) as Wins FilmFare Best Supporting Actress award
 Lady Tarzan (1990)
 Ramu Dada (1961)
 Dulhan (1975)
 Naukar Biwi Ka (1983)
 Raaj Tilak (1984)

References

External links 
 

1936 births
2023 deaths
Telugu actresses
Indian film actresses
Actresses from Andhra Pradesh
Actresses in Kannada cinema
India MPs 1989–1991
Indian actor-politicians
People from Bellary district
20th-century Indian actresses
20th-century Indian film directors
Indian women film directors
Hampi
Actresses in Hindi cinema
Film directors from Andhra Pradesh
Indian National Congress politicians from Andhra Pradesh
Actresses in Telugu cinema
Actresses in Tamil cinema
Indian stage actresses
Actresses in Telugu theatre
Indian child actresses
Child actresses in Telugu cinema
Actresses from Rajahmundry
Women in Andhra Pradesh politics
20th-century Indian women politicians
20th-century Indian politicians
Lok Sabha members from Andhra Pradesh
Santosham Film Awards winners
Filmfare Awards winners